The Chink is a scenic rock cleft between Bonchurch and Luccombe, Isle of Wight, with steps descending from St Boniface Down  to the Bonchurch Landslips below.

Its upper end is at the northern end of clifftop parkland accessed from the Leeson Road (A3055) car park, where there is a Southern Vectis bus route 3 stop.

The Chink was known in Victorian times as part of the development of the Bonchurch Landslips as a picturesque woodland walk.

One of several such paths with carved steps connecting the clifftop to the Isle of Wight Undercliff, it follows a joint through the Upper Greensand crags capping the cliffs above the Landslip. The path continues down through the Landslip as footpath V65, which joins the coastal path V65A at its foot.

A similar rock cleft, the better-known Devil's Chimney, is about 200 yards south.

References 

Landforms of the Isle of Wight
Tourist attractions on the Isle of Wight
Rock formations of England